The Traum S70  is a mid-size crossover utility vehicle (CUV) produced by the Chinese manufacturer Traum since 2017.

Overview
Launched in 2017 for the 2018 model year, the price range of the Traum S70 at launch starts from 81,900 yuan and ends at 115,900 yuan. The Traum-branded vehicles are manufactured by Jiangnan Auto, a subsidiary of Zotye.

Powertrain
Two engines are available including a 1.5L turbo engine producing 156 hp, and a 1.6L engine producing 116 hp. Two gearboxes are also available including a 5 speed manual gearbox, and a 6 speed automatic gearbox.

References

External links

Official website

Crossover sport utility vehicles
Mid-size sport utility vehicles
Front-wheel-drive vehicles
2010s cars
Cars introduced in 2017
Cars of China